The double murder of 8-year-old Mohammed Ammouri and 56-year-old Anna-Lena Svensson happened on 19 October 2004 in Linköping, Sweden. Both where stabbed to death at Åsgatan in Linköping. The murders remained unsolved and with no suspects for 16 years until the new method of ancestorial DNA was used. In June 2020, a suspect was arrested and later found guilty of the murders and sentenced to psychiatric care indefinitely. It was the first time in Swedish history that the method of ancestorial DNA was used to solve any murder or other crime in Sweden.

Investigation
Police could secure the murder weapon and a cap worn by the killer and secured the male's DNA. From the DNA results it could be confirmed that the suspect was from Northern Europe, had blonde hair, and was a smoker and snus user at the time. Police also stated that they believed that the suspect was in his twenties and likely was suffering from mental health issues. 

Alternative theories are that the murders were planned, in particular the murder of  Mohammed Ammour, this theory was brought out by Leif GW Persson and  Hasse Aro they also theorised that the suspect might not be mentally ill.

In 2010, a sketch of the suspect was revealed. The sketch and the case itself was brought up on the SVT crime show Veckans brott and it was broadcast on the anniversary of the murders, 19 October 2010. 

In 2018, the police released a second sketch of the suspect, this time it was created in the Netherlands based on the suspects DNA profile, a technique tested for the first time in Sweden at the time. The sketch led to over 100 new tips from the public, but no arrest.

The investigation into the double murders in Linköping is the second largest in Swedish history next to the investigation into the assassination of Prime Minister Olof Palme.

Arrest and prosecution 
On 9 June, 2020, sixteen years after the double murder, 37-year-old Daniel Nyqvist was arrested based on hits made in the commercial database of ancestorial DNA, combined with a family search of the person's DNA. The police was aided by professional ancestor scientist Peter Sjölund to help find the suspect's family tree.

A hit in the database familytreedna.com plus ancestor detective work by Sjölund back to the early 1800s provided enough information to give a certain hit. Based on the familial results Nyqvist's brother was also initially arrested but later released. A DNA test was made after Nyqvist's arrest which showed a 100% match between his DNA and the DNA found at the crime scene. Daniel Nyqvist confessed to the double murders the same day as he was arrested.

On 1 October, 2020, Nyqvist was found guilty and sentenced to psychiatric care indefinitely for the two murders. Nyqvist admitted in court that the two murders were unprovoked and that he heard voices that told him that he needed to kill someone. He first stabbed Mohammed Ammour, when Anna-Lena happened to see the murder she as well was attacked and stabbed to death. He was also ordered to pay the family of the murdered 8-year-old 350.000 (SEK), and 1,4 million (SEK) to the Swedish state. Anna-Lena's family did not request any compensation during the trial.

On 7 October in the same year, Nyqvist through his attorney Johan Ritzer announced he would not appeal his sentence.

References

2004 murders in Sweden